Patwardhan may refer to the surname most commonly used by members of Indian Chitpavan Brahmin families belonging to the Kaundinya gotra. The Karhade Patwardhans belong to the Kashyapa and Naidhruva Gotra and their history in the Rajapur region of the Konkan dates back to 1191 A.D. Copper plate grants have been recovered from the region, which also points to a Gurjar element in these settlers. Today the Karhade Patwardhans are also known by some other surnames such as Gurjar, Padhye, Bhat, Degwekar, Shouche and Huzurbazar.

Notable people
Patwardhan dynasty
Bhagyashree Patwardhan, Indian film actress.
Achyut Patwardhan, Indian independence activist and political leader and founder of the Socialist Party of India.
Aditya J Patwardhan, Indian film director, producer and scriptwriter.
Anand Patwardhan, Indian documentary filmmaker.
Anant Sadashiv Patwardhan, Indian politician.
Appa Patwardhan, Popularly known as Konkan Gandhi. Social reformer. Worked on sanitation, khadi and education issues.
Avinash Balkrishna Patwardhan, Indian civil engineer and lawyer.
Bhushan Patwardhan, former Vice Chancellor of Symbiosis International University.
Govindrao Patwardhan, harmonium and organ player.
Madhav Tryambak Patwardhan, Marathi poet and scholar who wrote under the pen name Madhav Julian.
Nikhil Patwardhan, Indian former first-class cricketer.
Nirmala Patwardhan, Indian ceramic artist.
Padma Gole, Marathi poet.
Ravi Patwardhan, Indian actor
Sudhir Patwardhan, Indian contemporary painter.
Vinayakrao Patwardhan, Indian vocalist.
Waman Dattatreya Patwardhan, Indian nuclear chemist.

References

Sources

See also

Hindu dynasties
Dynasties of India